Govejk (in order sources Govejek in Srnjak) is a small village in the Municipality of Idrija in the traditional Inner Carniola region of Slovenia. It lies on the road from Idrija to Žiri.

Name
The name of the settlement was changed from Govejek to Govejk in 1980. The older name Govejek in Srnjak 'Govejk and Srnjak' referred to the hamlet of Srnjak, today part of the neighboring village of Ledinske Krnice.

References

External links 

Govejk on Geopedia

Populated places in the Municipality of Idrija